Verdades Secretas is a Brazilian telenovela created by Walcyr Carrasco and directed by Mauro Mendonça Filho and Amora Mautner. It premiered on TV Globo on 8 June 2015. The telenovela focuses on Arlete, a beautiful young girl full of dreams who arrives in São Paulo willing to become a model, but ends up working as a luxury prostitute under the stage name "Angel".

In 2020, the telenovela was renewed for a second season, which premiered on Globoplay on 20 October 2021.

Series overview

Episodes

Season 1 (2015)

Season 2 (2021)

DVD release 
An abridged version of the first season, consisting of 25 episodes, was released on DVD in June 2016 by Globo Marcas.

Notes

References

External links 
 
 

Verdades Secretas